Percy Tyrone Sledge (November 25, 1940 – April 14, 2015) was an American R&B, soul and gospel singer. He is best known for the song "When a Man Loves a Woman", a No. 1 hit on both the Billboard Hot 100 and R&B singles charts in 1966. It was awarded a million-selling, Gold-certified disc from the RIAA.

Having previously worked as a hospital orderly in the early 1960s, Sledge achieved his strongest success in the late 1960s and early 1970s with a series of emotional soul songs. In later years, Sledge received the Rhythm and Blues Foundation's Career Achievement Award. He was inducted into the Rock & Roll Hall of Fame in 2005.

Biography

Early career
Sledge was born on November 25, 1940, in Leighton, Alabama. He worked in a series of agricultural jobs in the fields in Leighton, before taking a job as an orderly at Colbert County Hospital in Sheffield, Alabama. Through the mid-1960s, he toured the Southeast with the Esquires Combo on weekends, while working at the hospital during the week. A former patient and mutual friend of Sledge and record producer Quin Ivy introduced the two. An audition followed, and Sledge was signed to a recording contract.

Sledge's soulful voice was perfect for the series of soul ballads produced by Ivy and Marlin Greene, which rock critic Dave Marsh called "emotional classics for romantics of all ages". "When a Man Loves a Woman" was Sledge's first song recorded under the contract, and was released in March 1966. According to Sledge, the inspiration for the song came when his girlfriend left him for a modelling career after he was laid off from a construction job in late 1965, and, because bassist Calvin Lewis and organist Andrew Wright helped him with the song, he gave all the songwriting credits to them. It reached No. 1 in the US and went on to become an international hit. "When a Man Loves a Woman" was a hit twice in the UK, reaching No. 4 in 1966 and, on reissue, peaked at No. 2 in 1987. The song was also the first gold record released by Atlantic Records. The soul anthem became the cornerstone of Sledge's career, and was followed by "Warm and Tender Love" (covered by British singer Elkie Brooks in 1981), "It Tears Me Up", "Take Time to Know Her" (his second biggest US hit, reaching No. 11; the song's lyric was written by Steve Davis), "Love Me Tender", and "Cover Me".

Sledge charted with "I'll Be Your Everything" and "Sunshine" during the 1970s, and became an international concert favorite throughout the world, especially in the Netherlands, Germany, and on the African continent; he averaged 100 concerts a year in apartheid-era South Africa.

Later career
Sledge's career enjoyed a renaissance in the 1980s when "When a Man Loves a Woman" re-entered the UK Singles Chart, peaking at No. 2 behind the reissued Ben E. King classic "Stand by Me", after being used in a Levi's commercial. In the early 1990s, Michael Bolton brought "When a Man Loves a Woman" back into the limelight again on his hit album Time, Love, & Tenderness. On the week of November 17 to November 23, 1991, Bolton's version also hit No. 1 on the Billboard Hot 100 singles chart, exactly 25½ years to the week after Percy's did in 1966.

In 1994, Saul Davis and Barry Goldberg produced Sledge's album, Blue Night, for Philippe Le Bras' Sky Ranch label and Virgin Records. It featured Bobby Womack, Steve Cropper, and Mick Taylor among others. Blue Night received a Grammy nomination for Best Contemporary Blues Album, Vocal or Instrumental, and in 1996 it won the W.C. Handy Award for best soul or blues album.

In 2004, Davis and Goldberg also produced the Shining Through the Rain album, which preceded his induction into the Rock & Roll Hall of Fame. Songs on the CD were written by Mikael Rickfors, Steve Earle, the Bee Gees, Carla Olson, Denny Freeman, Allan Clarke and Jackie Lomax. The same year Percy recorded a live album with his band Sunset Drive entitled Percy Sledge and Sunset Drive – Live in Virginia on WRM Records produced by Warren Rodgers.

In May 2007, Percy was inducted into The Louisiana Music Hall Of Fame in his home city of Baton Rouge, LA.

In December 2010, Rhino Handmade issued a four-CD retrospective, The Atlantic Recordings, which covers all of the issued Atlantic masters, as well as many of the tracks unissued in the United States (although some were simply the mono versions of songs originally issued in stereo; Disc 1 comprises Sledge's first two LPs which were not recorded on stereo equipment). In 2011 Sledge toured with Sir Cliff Richard during his Soulicious tour, performing "I'm Your Puppet".

Personal life
Sledge married twice and was survived by his second wife, Rosa Sledge, whom he married in 1980. He had 12 children, three of whom became singers.

Death
Sledge died of liver cancer at his home in Baton Rouge on April 14, 2015, at the age of 74. His interment was in Baton Rouge's Heavenly Gates Cemetery.

Accolades
Sledge was:
An inaugural Rhythm and Blues Foundation Pioneer Award honoree in 1989.
Inducted into the Alabama Music Hall of Fame in 1993.
The recipient of the Blues Music Award in 1996 for best Soul/Blues album of the year with his record Blue Night.
Inducted into the Carolina Beach Music Hall of Fame in November 2004.
Inducted into the Rock and Roll Hall of Fame in 2005.
Inducted into the Louisiana Music Hall of Fame for his contributions by the State of Louisiana in May 2007.
Inducted into the Delta Music Museum in Ferriday, Louisiana.
In 2022 Sledge's hometown of Leighton, Alabama announced it would be having an annual event labeled as "Sledgefest".

Selected discography

Albums

Singles

 1994: "I Wish It Would Rain" (Sky Ranch / Virgin, Sweden) duet with Mikael Rickfors produced by Saul Davis & Barry Goldberg.
 1994 "You Got Away with Love" (Pat Robinson & Rocky Burnette) / "Why Did You Stop?" (Carla Olson) (Sky Ranch / Virgin, France) produced by Saul Davis & Barry Goldberg.

In popular culture
Sledge is sometimes cited as the inspiration behind the Australian language term "to sledge", meaning "to put someone off their game", first used in Test cricket, though the phrase more probably derives from "subtle as a sledgehammer".

References

External links

 
 
 
 

1941 births
2015 deaths
20th-century American singers
21st-century American singers
20th-century African-American male singers
American soul musicians
Atlantic Records artists
Deaths from cancer in Louisiana
Capricorn Records artists
Deaths from liver cancer
Monument Records artists
Singers from Alabama
American rhythm and blues singers
American soul singers
People from Colbert County, Alabama
Virgin Records artists
20th-century American male singers
21st-century American male singers
21st-century African-American male singers